Modern naval warfare is divided into four operational areas: surface warfare, air warfare,  submarine warfare, and information warfare. Each area comprises specialized platforms and strategies used to exploit tactical advantages unique and inherent to that area. Surface warfare involves surface ships.

Description
Modern surface warfare dates from the mid-20th century, when surface, air, and submarine warfare components were blended together as a tactical unit to achieve strategic objectives. In US Navy doctrine, the two most important strategic objectives are interdiction and sea control.

 Interdiction is the process of intercepting an enemy transiting through a location. For example, German naval objectives against Britain during World War II's Battle of the Atlantic were primarily focused on preventing ships from arriving intact with their cargoes.
 Sea control is the dominance of force over a given area that prevents other naval forces from operating successfully. For example, the mission of the Allied navies in the Atlantic during World War II was to maintain sea control and prevent Axis naval forces from operating. The Anti-access/area denial is an opposition to enemy's sea control without itself being an attempt to gain sea control.

Surface warfare (SuW) is conducted by a surface ship to eliminate a threat, which may include anti-surface warfare (ASuW), anti-air warfare (AAW), anti-submarine warfare (ASW), naval gunfire support (NGFS), riverine operations, mine warfare, and electronic warfare.

In the second half of the 20th century, the importance of naval surface power was reduced as air and submarine warfare platforms demonstrated their capabilities. This lesson was brought home through the surprising results of the Battle of Taranto, the Battle of Pearl Harbor, and the sinking of Prince of Wales and Repulse.

Following World War II, guided anti-ship missiles required new tactics and doctrines. Small, fast, relatively cheap missile boats became a threat for large ships, much more serious than previous torpedo boats. Proof of concept arrived on 20 October 1967 with the loss of an Israeli destroyer Eilat to Egyptian missile boats.

Ships
Surface combatant ships include battleships, aircraft carriers, cruisers, destroyers, frigates, and others. Surface combatants also include mine warfare ships, amphibious command ships, coastal defense ships, amphibious assault ships, and many others. An important facet of naval warfare are however the support ships (that is, non-combat ships): freighters, oilers, hospital ships, tugs, troop transports, and other auxiliary ships. In the U.S. Navy model, now widespread in the world, various types of ships would be primarily organized into the carrier battle group.

See also
Naval warfare
Naval tactics

Naval warfare